Look at Yourself is the seventh studio album by American band Emmure. It is the first album to feature the new line-up with Joshua Travis, Phil Lockett, and Josh Miller. The album was released on March 3, 2017, through SharpTone Records. In October 2016, Emmure released "Torch", the first single from the album, with "Russian Hotel Aftermath" following two months later.

Following the release of the album, some versions no longer feature the audio sample at the beginning of the track "Flag of the Beast" due to the band being unable to get clearance and permission to use it, as the band confirmed themselves via a comment on the track-by-track video of the song.

Track listing

Personnel

Emmure
 Frankie Palmeri - vocals
 Joshua Travis - guitars, programming
 Phil Lockett - bass
 Josh Miller - drums

Production
 Drew Fulk - production, composing, mixing 
 Jeff Dunne - engineering, mixing
 Mike Kalajian - mastering

Charts

References

2017 albums
Emmure albums
SharpTone Records albums